Agrebi is a surname. Notable people with the surname include:

Fatma Agrebi (born 1990), Tunisian volleyball player
Hamza Agrebi (born 1991), Tunisian footballer
Mohamed Agrebi (born 1961), Tunisian politician
Saida Agrebi (born 1945), Tunisian politician
Slim Agrebi (born 1974), Tunisian judoka